Phil Carreón (aka Phillip Lozano Carreón, Jr.; né Alonzo Carreón; May 6, 1923 – October 13, 2010) was an American big band leader based in Los Angeles who flourished from 1946 to 1952, retiring from music in 1952.

Career 
Carreón's orchestras performed stock arrangements from Count Basie and other popular swing bands and performed custom arrangements that distinguished his orchestra in both swing and Latin jazz.  The Latin jazz was essentially American big band swing-jazz fused with Afro-Hispanic music — mambo and bolero, in particular.  His band's Latin style became a popular trend with a few other notable Latin oriented Los Angeles big bands that influenced what became salsa. Carreón's band performed in ballrooms around Los Angeles (including the Avadon Ballroom), the rest of the West Coast, the Southwest — and as far as Texas (including Antonio Valencia's famous Patio Andatuz in San Antonio) and Louisiana — in the 1950s.  Several major jazz musicians, early in their careers, performed with his band, including a group of saxophonists that included Teddy Edwards, Herb Geller, Warne Marsh, and Herbie Steward.  The legendary composer, Lennie Niehaus, who went on to write for Basie and the film industry, got his first professional job out of high school as a composer and saxophonist with Carreón.

Carreón was a clarinet player; but as a band leader, he did not play an instrument.  Notwithstanding the extant recordings of Carreón's popular music, his legacy as the leader of an outstanding swing big band is chronicled but not audibly enshrined due either an absence of jazz discography or an absence of jazz recording sessions. Yet, a consensus of published acclaim by notable band alumni, entertainment peers, musicologists, and historians is that the swing aspect of Carreón's big band was excellent.

According to a 1998 interview with Don Tosti (1923–2004), early in his career, Carreón worked for a Mexican-American jukebox industry entrepreneur Frank Navarro (né Francisco B. Navarro; 1895–1964), owner of Navarro Music Company, driving around Los Angeles replacing older albums with recent hit records.

In 1951, Carreón signed a professional management contract with Reg Marshall Agency, a talent management firm based in Hollywood, and went on tour in Colorado, New Mexico, and Arizona. In that same year, his orchestra members were composed entirely of Mexican Americans, according to an article in the Prensa, a San Antonio Spanish language newspaper.  In the early 1950s, his orchestra was aired on the Mutual Broadcasting System.

Service in the U.S. Armed Forces 
During World War II, Carreón enlisted in the United States Army and received his basic training at the Infantry Replacement Training Center, Camp Roberts, California, then volunteered for the ski troops.  As a member of the Army Mountain Infantry regiment, Carreón was a Browning automatic rifleman in the 1943 U.S. assault on and capture of Japanese occupied Kiska, in the Aleutian Islands.  After returning from the Aleutian Islands, Carreón was stationed at Camp Hale, Colorado, with the ski troops, where he also played clarinet in the United States Army 1st Combat Infantry Band and several small, informal, dance bands.  Pvt. Carreón wore the Asiatic-Pacific and American Defense ribbons, one campaign star, and was awarded the Expert Infantryman Badge.

Featured performers, arrangers, composers 
 Vocalists
 Vikki Carr (born 1940), featured vocalist
 Toni Aubin (1927–1990), featured vocalist
 Ray Vasquez (1924–2019), trombonist and featured vocalist
 Rudy Macias (1925–2012), vocalist, born in El Paso
 Frances Irvin (1929–2003), vocalist, born in Fort Worth, raised in Amarillo

 Instrumentalists
 Lennie Niehaus (1929–2020), lead alto, composer, arranger
 Herb Geller (1928–2013), saxophonist
 Herbie Steward (1926–2003), tenor saxophonist
 Teddy Edwards (1924–2003), tenor saxophonist, composer, arranger
 Warne Marsh (1927–1987), tenor saxophonist
 Billy Byers (1927–1996), trombonist
 Gerald Wilson (1918–2014), trumpeter

Growing up 
Carreón attended Roosevelt High School in Los Angeles.  While a student, he was the leader of the ROTC Band and also led his own group, Phil Carreón and His Orchestra, a 15-piece orchestra.  He had studied clarinet since age 11.

Selected discography

Philmos Records, Philmos Recording Co., Los Angeles

Latino Internacional Inc., Los Angeles
 "Rico, Caliente Y Sabroso" (mambo)
 Phil Carreon y Su Orquesta
 108-A (10-in, 78-rpm)
 "La Guira" (mambo)
 Phil Carreon y Su Orquesta (mambo)
 Rudy Marcias, vocals
 108-B (10-in, 78-rpm)
 "Mambo No. 8" (mambo), Perez Prado
 Phil Carreon y Su Orquesta (mambo)
 110-A (45-rpm)

Whimsy, Ltd., 6118 Selma Ave., Hollywood
 "How Strange"
 Phil Carreon and His Orchestra
 Johnny Clark, vocalist
 Whimsy 243
 "Yuletide"
 Phil Carreon and His Orchestra
 Johnny Clark, vocalist
 Whimsy 243
 "I Know My Limitations"
 Phil Carreon and His Orchestra
 Johnny Clark, vocalist
 Whimsy 244
 "L.C. Jump"
 Whimsy 244
 "I Close My Eyes"
 Ray Vasquez, vocalist
 Whimsy 245
 "No Comment!"
 Johnny Clark, vocalist
 Whimsy 245

Other
 "I'm In the Mood for Love"
 Melodias Rancheras (released 1951)
 Phil Carreon
Notes
Philmos Records was founded in 1950 in Los Angeles by Ray Ramos
Whimsy was the label of Whimsy, Ltd., Hollywood
Johnny Clark (born 1916) and Dian Manners dba as Whimsy, Ltd.
 Whimsy label dating guide:
 241 – May 1947
 243 – June 1947
 821 – September 1947
In 1951, Whimsy, Ltd., called itself a public relations firm

Various names of Carreón's orchestras 
 Phil Carreon and His Orchestra
 Phil Carreon and His Philmos Recording Orchestra
 Phil Carreon and His Popular Latin American Orchestra
 Phil Carreon and His Famous 15 Piece Band
 Phil Carreón y Su Orquesta

Family 
 Parents
Carreón's parents:
 Filipe Herrera Carreón (1890–1965), was born in Chihuahua, Mexico
 Guadalupe ("Lupe") Lozano (1894–1956), who was born in Montemorelos, Mexico
They became naturalized United States citizens.

 Siblings
Phil Carreon had six siblings, two brothers and four sisters.

 Marriage
Carreón married Xina Yvonne (née Zinn; born 1926) around 1949.  They had four children: (i) Daniel Thomas Carreon (1950–2013) survived by wife Judy Harward and 8 children, Jennifer, Kristen, Daniel, John Paul, Rebecca, Bethany, Sarah and Michaela; (ii) Phyllis Carreon (born 1955), who was first married to Vincent Frank Cesare and is currently married to Raymond Alan Taie since 1982 with daughter Kelly Kristine (Pfeiffer); (iii) Patrick Anthony Carreon (born 1958) currently married to Tamerin Kelly with daughter Mary Katherine, and (iv) Yvonne Susanne Carreon (born 1960), married to Karl Alan Schoneman, divorced in 2006 with 4 children Ted, Alexandria, Nicola and Phillip.

Notes and references
Notes

Original copyrights
 Catalog of Copyright Entries, Part 3 Musical Compositions, Third Series, Library of Congress, Copyright Office

Citations

1923 births
2010 deaths
Swing bandleaders
Big band bandleaders
Progressive big band bandleaders
American jazz bandleaders
Jazz musicians from California
Musicians from Los Angeles
American music arrangers
Territory bands
United States Army personnel of World War II
United States Army soldiers